Jaber Jasim (Arabic:جابر جاسم) (born 7 December 1979) is an Emirati footballer. He currently plays as a goalkeeper .

Career
He formerly played for Al Khaleej, and Ajman.

References

External links
 

1979 births
Living people
Emirati footballers
Khor Fakkan Sports Club players
Ajman Club players
UAE Pro League players
UAE First Division League players
Association football goalkeepers
Place of birth missing (living people)